Dr. Tom Sannicandro (born March 22, 1956) is an American attorney, businessman, researcher, and higher education leader,  the founder of SpecialNeedsTrustsOnline.com a non-profit website providing estate planning documents to families with children with special needs. Previously he served as director of the Massachusetts Association of Community Colleges. In that position he developed and instituted an advocacy campaign to establish the SUCCESS Fund (Supporting Urgent Community College Equity through Student Services) resulting millions of more dollars to the community colleges.  He was formerly the director of the Institute for Community Inclusion at UMass Boston from 2017 to 2019. From 2005 to 2017, he served in the Massachusetts House of Representatives, representing the 7th Middlesex district.

Sannicandro has been called "a strong advocate for education funding and a strong voice for people with disabilities."

Education and early career 
Sannicandro earned a bachelor's degree from the College of the Holy Cross in 1978 and attended Suffolk University Law School, earning a J.D. in 1982. Upon completing law school, he worked as a corporate attorney, representing midsized manufacturing clients throughout New England. He later transitioned to representing individuals with disabilities, helping students and families to enforce their educational rights. As an academic researcher, he published various articles exploring the effect of higher education for individuals with intellectual and developmental disabilities and health care trends for children with special health care needs.

While serving as state representative, he earned an MPA from Harvard University's John F. Kennedy School of Government in 2011. He also earned a master's and a Ph.D. in social policy from Brandeis University's Heller School for Social Policy and Management in 2015 and 2016 respectively. His doctoral dissertation was called The Effect of Postsecondary Education on Employment and Income for Individuals with Intellectual Disabilities.

Political career
From 2000 until 2005, Sannicandro served on the Ashland School Committee, becoming committee chair by the end of his tenure. In 2004, Sannicandro ran for a seat in the House of Representatives' 7th Middlesex district after Representative Karen Spilka decided to run for a seat in the Massachusetts Senate. In the general election, he defeated Republican nominee Mary Connaughton, who would later be the Republican nominee for Massachusetts Auditor, unsuccessfully running against Suzanne Bump. He easily won reelection five more times, and was unopposed in 2008 and 2014. He did not seek reelection in 2016, and was succeeded by Jack Patrick Lewis.

During his tenure in the House of Representatives, Sannicandro championed legislation focusing on public higher education, and chaired the Joint Committee on Higher Education. During the great recession he authored legislation using bond money to create a pool of $200 million to support public and private higher education institutions. This bill became part of the 2012 Economic Development Bill. In addition, Sannicandro sponsored a number of initiatives including the Inclusive Concurrent Enrollment Program, where students with intellectual or developmental disabilities attended Massachusetts public colleges and universities, and the Real Lives Bill, giving individuals served by the Department of Developmental Services control over their lives by controlling their budgets.

After leaving the House of Representatives, Sannicandro became director of the Institute of Community Inclusion at the University of Massachusetts Boston. He left that role in 2019 to become Director of the Massachusetts Association of Community Colleges, an advocacy organization on behalf of the fifteen public community colleges in Massachusetts, their Boards of Trustees, and the approximately 150,000 students enrolled in those community colleges.

Sannicandro passion for disability issue results from his lived experience as the father of an adult son with special needs under the Americans with Disabilities Act of 1990. He has leveraged these circumstances into a career, advocating as an attorney on behalf of disability needs, in particular children. — And as a seated member of the Massachusetts House of Representatives, endeavors to expand his contributions towards proactive avocation within the body. The implicit need for such representation is reflected by the two-thirds majority who entrusted this seat upon such a platform. In turn Sannicandro has implemented a website allowing his constituents fluid access and ability to influence the process.

References

External links
Member profile Tom Sannicandro
Official website

American people of Italian descent
Living people
People from Framingham, Massachusetts
Massachusetts city council members
College of the Holy Cross alumni
Suffolk University Law School alumni
Harvard Kennedy School alumni
Brandeis University alumni
1956 births
Democratic Party members of the Massachusetts House of Representatives
21st-century American politicians